Łagowski or Lagowski is a Polish surname or an adjective meaning from Łagow. It may refer to:

People 
J J Lagowski (?–2014), American chemist
Bronisław Łagowski (born 1937), Polish political scientist

Places 
Łagów Landscape Park in Poland